The term nexus driver refers to a bus device driver that interfaces leaf drivers to a specific I/O bus and provides the low-level integration of this I/O bus.

Device drivers